Kendal, once Kirkby in Kendal or Kirkby Kendal, is a market town and civil parish in the South Lakeland district of Cumbria, England,  south-east of Windermere and  north of Lancaster. Historically in Westmorland, it is destined to be the administrative centre of the Westmorland and Furness unitary authority from 1 April 2023. It lies within the dale of the River Kent, from which its name is derived. At the 2011 Census, the town had a population of 28,586, making it the third largest town in Cumbria after Carlisle and Barrow-in-Furness. It is renowned today mainly as a centre for shopping, for its festivals and historic sights, including Kendal Castle, and as the home of Kendal Mint Cake. The town's grey limestone buildings have earned it the sobriquet "Auld Grey Town".

Name
Kendal takes its name from the River Kent (the etymology of whose name is uncertain but thought to be Celtic) and the Old Norse word dalr ("valley"). Kendal is listed in the Domesday Book as part of Yorkshire with the name Cherchebi (from Old Norse kirkju-bý, "church-village"). For many centuries it was called Kirkby Kendal: "village with a church in the valley of the River Kent".

History
A chartered market town, the centre of Kendal has formed round a high street with fortified alleyways, known locally as yards, off to either side, which allowed local people to shelter from the Anglo-Scottish raiders known as Border Reivers. The main industry in those times was the manufacture of woollen goods, whose importance is reflected in the town's coat of arms and in its Latin motto Pannus mihi panis (Cloth is my bread.) "Kendal Green" was a hard-wearing, wool-based fabric specific to the local manufacturing process. It was supposedly sported by the Kendalian archers instrumental in the English victory over the French at the Battle of Agincourt. Kendal Green was also worn by slaves in the Americas and appears in songs and literature from that time. Shakespeare notes it as the colour of clothing worn by foresters (Henry IV, Part 1).

Kendal Castle has a long history as a stronghold, built on the site of several successive castles. The earliest was a Norman motte and bailey (now located on the west side of the town), when the settlement went under the name of Kirkbie Strickland. The most recent is from the late 12th century, as the castle of the Barony of Kendal, the part of Westmorland ruled from here. The castle is best known as the home of the Parr family, as heirs of these barons. They inherited it through marriage in the reign of Edward III of England. Rumours still circulate that King Henry VIII's sixth wife Catherine Parr was born at Kendal Castle, but the evidence available leaves this unlikely: by her time the castle was beyond repair and her father was already based in Blackfriars, London, at the court of King Henry VIII.

Roman fort

A Roman fort stood about 2 miles south of today's town centre, at a site later known as Watercrook. It was built about AD 90, originally in timber, rebuilt with stone about 130, in the reign of Hadrian. The fort was abandoned for about 20 years during the Antonine re-occupation of Scotland. It was rebuilt in the reign of Marcus Aurelius and occupied until about 270 – probably the last time it served military purposes. What remains of the stone structure is now buried under a field. Many Roman artefacts from the site may be found in the Kendal Museum. The Roman site was built on a pre-existing Iron Age fort.

Transport
Early travellers to Kendal complained of eight miles of "nothing but a confused mixture of Rockes and Boggs." Riding horseback was the fastest form of travel, as the road was "no better than the roughest fell tracks on high ground and spongy, miry tracks in the vallies."

It became clear it was unjust and beyond the power of a thinly scattered rural population to maintain a road used for through traffic. "Whereas the road is very ruinous, and some parts thereof almost impassable and could not, by the ordinary course appointed by the Laws then in being for repairing the highways, be amended and kept in good repair, unless some further provision was made." In 1703, by Order of the Quarter Sessions of the Barony of Kendall, the surveyors of highways were to make the roads good and sufficient for the passage of coaches, carts and carriages. In 1753 the Keighley and Kendal Turnpike brought a stage coach service from Yorkshire as far as Kendal.

Mint cake

Kendal is known for Kendal mint cake, a glucose-based confectionery reputedly discovered accidentally by Joseph Wiper during a search for a clear glacier mint.

Used on numerous expeditions to mountaintops (including Mount Everest and K2) and both poles of the Earth, its popularity is mainly due to the very astute decision of the original manufacturer's great-nephew to market it as an energy food and supply it to Ernest Shackleton's 1914–1917 Trans-Antarctic Expedition.

By the time the business was sold to a competitor, Romney's, in 1987 there were several rival mint-cake producers, some still in business.

Tobacco and snuff
Snuff manufacture in Kendal dates from 1792, when Kendalian Thomas Harrison returned from learning its production in Glasgow, Scotland. He brought with him 50 tons of second-hand equipment, all carried on horseback. Pipe tobacco and other tobacco products were added later to the firm's production. Ownership of the firm passed to a son-in-law, Samuel Gawith, whose eponymic firm Samuel Gawith & Co. remains in business. After Gawith's death in 1865, the firm passed to his two eldest sons, being administered initially by trustees, including Henry Hoggarth, and John Thomas Illingworth.

Illingworth left the firm in 1867 to start his own firm, which remained in business until the 1980s. The youngest son of Samuel Gawith subsequently teamed with Henry Hoggarth to form Gawith Hoggarth TT, Ltd. Both firms continue in business in Kendal, producing snuffs and tobacco products used around the world. Samuel Gawith and Company holds the distinction of employing the oldest piece of industrial equipment still in use in the world: a device manufactured in the 1750s.

The Kendal Bank

The Maude, Wilson & Crewdsons Bank was established in "Farrers House", Stramongate in 1788. Joseph Maude, Christopher Wilson and Thomas Crewdson were the original partners. In 1792 they moved into a specially constructed premises at No 69, Highgate. The Wilson family, who lived at Abbot Hall, withdrew in 1826 at a time of the paper panic of 1825 caused by a run on the banks. Under the style of W D Crewdson & Sons, the remaining family continued until the amalgamation in 1840 with John Wakefield & Sons founded by John Wakefield. The bank was eventually bought out by Barclays.

Governance

Civic history
The municipal borough of Kendal was created in 1835; until 1894 it was also an urban sanitary district. The borough boundaries were altered in 1935 under a County Review Order to include a patch of South Westmorland Rural District. The civil parishes of Kirkland and Nether Graveship became in 1908 part of Kendal Civil Parish, whose boundaries thereafter were the same as the borough's. From 1888 to 1974, Kendal was the centre of the administrative county of Westmorland, although Appleby was the traditional county town.

The borough was abolished in 1974 under the Local Government Act 1972, becoming part of the South Lakeland district of Cumbria. Kendal as a successor parish kept its own town council.

From April 2023, Kendal will be the seat of the new Westmorland and Furness council area. Cumbria and South Lakeland will be abolished at the same time.

Parliament
Kendal is part of the Westmorland and Lonsdale parliamentary constituency, of which Tim Farron is the current MP, representing the Liberal Democrats.

Geography
Kendal stands on the River Kent, surrounded by low hills and near the Lake District National Park formed in 1951, but not in it. which was laid out to exclude the town. Kendal's rural location makes it an important commercial centre for a wide area. It has been dubbed "The Gateway to The Lakes".

Climate
Kendal has a marine west-coast climate, category Cfb on the Köppen Climate Classification. It has moderately warm summers and mild winters with precipitation at all times of year. In July and August the average daily maximum and minimum are  respectively.

Economy
Kendal's early prosperity was based largely on cloth manufacture. In the 19th century it became a centre for the manufacture of snuff and shoes – the K Shoes company remained a major employer in the town until its factory closed in 2003. There are still several industries based in the town, such as Gilbert Gilkes & Gordon (manufacturers of pumps and turbines), James Cropper paper makers (based in Burneside, who make, at no profit, the paper for the Remembrance poppies for The Royal British Legion), Mardix (switchgear), Lakeland, and Kendal Nutricare, which has a facility for making baby milk in the north of the town. Tourism is now a major employer, but there is also a significant IT and design sector, enabled by increased broadband availability.

On 26 February 2003 Kendal was granted Fairtrade Town status.

Transport

Kendal railway station lies on the Windermere Branch Line, with connections to Windermere to the north, and to Oxenholme Lake District station (on the West Coast Main Line) and Lancaster railway station to the south.

It is bypassed on the west side by the A591 road, linking it to Windermere and Keswick, and by the A590 leading to Barrow. It is also the end point of the A65 road to Kirkby Lonsdale, Skipton and Yorkshire, and a destination on the A6 road to Penrith. Kendal is signposted off the M6 at Junctions 36 (A65, A590), 37 (A684 road), 38 (A685 road) and 39 (A6). A three-mile, £1.9m A591 bypass opened on 29 August 1971.

The Lancaster Canal was built as far as Kendal in 1819, but the northern section was rendered unnavigable by the construction of the M6. Part of this section was drained and filled in to prevent leakage, and the course of the canal through Kendal has now been built over. The canal towpath, however, remains as a footpath through Kendal. A campaign is underway to restore the canal as far as Kendal.

Kendal has a daily coach service to London. Local buses from the bus station serve destinations such as Ambleside, Barrow-in-Furness and Lancaster, with long-distance National Express coaches to Preston and Birmingham.

Education
The Queen Katherine School, on Appleby Road, is a secondary school with academy status. The school also has a sixth form.

Kirkbie Kendal School, formerly Kendal Grammar School, is a secondary school Business and Enterprise College serving the area. It operates as a foundation school with academy status. Its former pupils include the historian David Starkey.

Kendal College provides further and higher education courses and the training for employers.

Sport
Kendal Town Football Club plays in the North West Division one, with home games at Parkside Road Stadium.

Kendal RUFC plays in the 6th tier of the English rugby union system, with home games at Mint Bridge Stadium, which has a capacity of 3,500.

Places of interest

Kendal Museum, one of the oldest in the country, includes exhibits on area history, culture, archaeology, geology, local and world natural history, Roman Britain, and Ancient Egypt.
Abbot Hall Art Gallery (housed in a Georgian villa) mounts nationally important exhibitions, such as David Bomberg: Spirit in the Mass (17 July – 28 October 2006). The permanent collection covers George Romney, J. M. W. Turner, John Ruskin, Ben Nicholson, Paula Rego, Lucian Freud, Stanley Spencer and Barbara Hepworth.
The Museum of Lakeland Life in the original stables of Abbot Hall contains exhibits on farming life in the Lake District and a permanent collection of author Arthur Ransome's books and belongings.
Castle Howe, Kendal's first castle.
Kendal Castle, to the east of the earthworks, was probably built while Castle Howe was still in use.
The Friends' Meeting House is home to the Quaker Tapestry.
The Brewery Arts Centre offers theatre, dance, exhibitions, cinema, music, workshops, youth drama, dance, and food and drink.
The Queen Katherine Street drill hall was used to mobilize troops in the First World War.
The Lakes International Comic Art Festival is held in Kendal every year in October.
Other places of interest are Kendal Leisure Centre, Kendal Parish Church (Holy Trinity), Lakeland Radio Stadium official football ground of Kendal Town F.C., and *Netherfield Cricket Club Ground, the home ground of Netherfield Cricket Club and Cumberland County Cricket Club.

Notable people
Dave Allen (born 1955), bass player for post-punk band Gang of Four
Desmond Bagley (1923–1983), thriller writer
Matt Bigland (born 1985), guitarist and lead singer for alternative rock band Dinosaur Pile-Up
Jonathan Dodgson Carr (died 1884), founder of Carr's bread makers and social reform campaigner
Ephraim Chambers (c. 1680–1740), encyclopedian
Isaac Crewdson (1780–1844), Quaker minister born in Kendal
John Cunliffe (1933–2018), children's author, creator of Postman Pat
John Dalton (1766–1844), chemist and physicist
Sir Arthur Eddington (1882–1944), astrophysicist
James Ellison (born 1980) and Dean Ellison (born 1977), motorcycle racers
Tim Farron (born 1970), current MP for Westmorland and Lonsdale and former leader of the Liberal Democrats
Nicholas Freeston (1907–1978), award-winning Lancashire poet, born in Kendal
Daniel Gardner (1750–1805), portrait painter
Steven Hall, Britain's Got Talent finalist 2011 as a comedy dancer
Steve Hogarth (born 1959), vocalist of rock band Marillion
Francis Nigel Lee (1934–2011), theologian
Isabella Lickbarrow (1784–1847), poet
Ken Major (1928–2009), architect, author and molinologist, attended Kendal School
Peter McDonnell: Footballer, 
Caroline Moir (living), author
James Rogers (born 1958) first-class cricketer
George Romney (1734–1802), portrait painter
David R. Russell (1935–2018), antique woodworking tool collector
Philip Snow (1907–1985), first-class cricketer
Keith Stainton (1921–2001), politician and Second World War hero in France
David Starkey (born 1945), constitutional historian
Alfred Wainwright (1907–1991), guidebook author and walker
Mary Augusta Wakefield (1853–1910) composer and festival organizer
William Wakefield (1870–1922), cricketer
Wild Beasts, indie-rock band
Keith Wilkinson (living), ITV television news reporter
John Wilson (1741–1793), mathematician and astronomer
Mark Wilson (born 1989), Newcastle Falcons and England Rugby Union player

Local dialect
Kendal speech, known as Kendalian, is an example of the Cumbrian dialect spoken in the surrounding area.

Search and rescue

Kendal has long maintained a locally active, voluntary mountain search and rescue team based at Busher Walk. Along with nearby teams, it helped at the Grayrigg derailment in February 2007. Kendal Mountain Rescue Team is one of ten current teams that joined with Lake District Mountain Rescue Search Dogs and Cumbria Ore Mines Rescue Unit to form a Cumbrian umbrella organization, the Lake District Search and Mountain Rescue Association.

Twin towns
Kendal is twinned with:
 Killarney, Ireland
 Rinteln, Germany

Freedom
The following people and military units have received the Freedom of the Town of Kendal:

Individuals
Sir Arthur Eddington : 1930

Military units
The Border Regiment: 25 October 1947
The King's Own Royal Border Regiment: 1 October 1959
The Duke of Lancaster's Regiment: 1 July 2006

See also

Kendal Choral Society
Listed buildings in Kendal
Kendal Mountain Festival
Kendal Town F.C.
The Westmorland Gazette

References

External links

 Cumbria County History Trust: Kendal (formerly Kirkby Kendal) (nb: provisional research only – see Talk page)
Kendal Town Council
The Northern Reaches—Restoration of the canal to Kendal
Kendal Museum
Kendal Leisure Centre

 
Towns in Cumbria
Civil parishes in Cumbria